On Tiptoes is an Iranian television comedy serial. It was  broadcast for the first time by the IRIB on Thursday 10 September 2002 until Thursday 10 January 2003. It could usually be seen every night at 8:00 p.m. Tehran time on Tehran TV, also known as Channel 5 in Iran. Later due to the popularity of the show, episodes were shown in syndication on various Iranian provincial channels as well as IRIB 1 & IRIB 2 for those living out of the country. It was directed by Mehran Modiri.

Shabhaye Barareh is the prequel to On Tiptoes. Shabhaye Barareh is set in Barareh and describes Farhad's family more than fifty years ago. The series also has many of the cast members from other Modiri works such as Noghtechin, and Jayezeye Bozorg. In On Tiptoes Modiri plays the role of Farhad, and Shir Farhad(Farhad's father). In Shabhaye Barareh, Modiri is playing the younger version of Shir Farhad. Shabhaye Barareh also features Toghrol, showing him to have had a military career in his youth, hence his strict behaviour and attitude.

Plot summary
On Tiptoes's episodes mostly dealt with the situations that Farhad (Mehran Modiri), an architect living in Tehran would end up in along with members of his family and friends. Farhad was originally from a fictional village in Iran, named Barareh. He had moved to Tehran, when he had been accepted into university. He eventually settled in Tehran and married a woman named Mahtab (Sahar Zakaria). The real story though begins when Farhad's cousin, Davoud (Javad Razavian) moves to Tehran from Barareh to find a job. Davoud has very little in terms of education, and still carries a thick accent, showing his Barareh roots. Farhad's sister, Shadi (Sahar Valadbeigi) also has come to Tehran to begin her studies in university. Toghrol (Mohammad-Reza Hedayati), an old man who hates anything related to Barareh is a friend of Mahtab's family, and helps maintain the property which Farhad and his wife live on. Farhad and Davoud are often the recipients of severe beatings from Toghrol. Davoud finds employment at the engineering company Farhad works at. Davoud has to be the tea-boy because of his poor educational background. Davoud slowly starts reminding Farhad of his village's culture and ways, which often would give hilarious results. Davoud would eventually marry Yasaman (Shaghayegh Dehghan), and soon after Mahtab's brother would become a cast member, eventually marrying Farhad's sister.

Cast
Mehran Modiri - Farhad Barareh/Farhad's father "Shir Farhad Barareh"
Sahar Zakaria - Mahtab Mahtabi
Javad Razavian - Davoud Barareh/Davood's Father
Siamak Ansari - Sepehr Mahtabi
Shaghayegh Dehghan - Yasaman
Sahar Valadbeigi - Shadi Barareh
Mohammad-Reza Hedayati - Toghrol
Ebrahim Abadi -  Mr.Mahtabi
Hayedeh Haeri - Ms.Mahtabi
Saeid Pirdoost - Raees Raessina
Saed Hedayati - Saeed Saeedi
Vahid Mahindoost - Vahid
Haydeh Haeri - Mother of Mahtab and Sepehr
Sepand Amirsoleimani - Son of Raees
Hadi Kazemi - Hessam Dobarareh
Ateneh Faghih Nasiri - Friend of Shadi
Shahab Abbasi - Ab Dozdak
Negar Foroozandeh - Nazanin
Asghar Heidari - Friend of Farhad
Hassan Shokohi - Azizkhan

Writers
Head Writer: Peyman Ghasem Khani
Writers: Mehrab Ghasem Khani, Reza Moti, Alireza Nazr Fasihi, Amir Mahdi Jule, Khashayar Alvand

References

External links

IRIB's production site about the series

Iranian television series
2000s Iranian television series
2002 Iranian television series debuts
2003 Iranian television series endings
Islamic Republic of Iran Broadcasting original programming
Persian-language television shows